Illinois's 1st House of Representatives district is a Representative district within the Illinois House of Representatives located in Cook County, Illinois. It has been represented by Democrat Aaron Ortiz since January 9, 2019. The district was previously represented by Democrat Daniel J. Burke from 2013 to 2018.

The district covers parts of Chicago, Forest View, and Stickney, and of Chicago's neighborhoods, it covers Archer Heights, Bridgeport, Brighton Park, Chicago Lawn, Gage Park, Garfield Ridge, McKinley Park, New City, and West Elsdon.

Representative district history

Prominent representatives

List of representatives

1849 – 1873

1957 – 1973

1983 – Present

Historic District Boundaries

Electoral history

2030 – 2022

2020 – 2012

2010 – 2002

2000 – 1992

1990 – 1982

1970 – 1962

1960 – 1956

Notes

References

Government of Chicago
Illinois House of Representatives districts